Anolis vinosus is a species of lizard in the family Dactyloidae. The species is found in Haiti.

References

Anoles
Reptiles described in 1968
Endemic fauna of Haiti
Reptiles of Haiti
Taxa named by Albert Schwartz (zoologist)